John Scott (August 28, 1913 – March 7, 1967) was an American Negro league outfielder in the 1940s.

A native of Magnolia, Arkansas, Scott made his Negro leagues debut in 1944 for the Birmingham Black Barons. He went on to play five seasons with the Kansas City Monarchs, where he was a teammate of Baseball Hall of Famer Jackie Robinson in 1945, and represented Kansas City in the 1946 East–West All-Star Game. Scott died in Los Angeles, California in 1967 at age 53.

References

External links
 and Baseball-Reference Black Baseball stats and Seamheads
 John Scott at Arkansas Baseball Encyclopedia

1913 births
1967 deaths
Birmingham Black Barons players
Kansas City Monarchs players
Baseball outfielders
Baseball players from Arkansas
People from Magnolia, Arkansas
20th-century African-American sportspeople